Suthora is a genus of parrotbill in the family Paradoxornithidae.

Species
It contains the following species:

References

 
Bird genera
Parrotbills